This is a list of the winners of the Moscow City Chess Championship from 1899 to date. From 1921 to 1924 Nikolai Grigoriev voluntarily defended his title in matches against other challengers.

{| class="sortable wikitable"
! Year !! Winner 
|-
| 1899 match  || Alexander Solovtsov
|-
| 1900    || Vladimir Nenarokov
|-
| 1901    || Aleksei Goncharov & Raphael Falk
|-
| 1902    || Vladimir A. Boyarkov
|-
| 1908    || Vladimir Nenarokov
|-
| 1909    || Aleksei Goncharov
|-
| 1911    || Ossip Bernstein
|-
| 1913 match  || Peter Yurdansky
|-
| 1919–20 || Alexander Alekhine
|-
| 1920–21  || Josef Cukierman
|-
| 1921–22  || Nikolai Grigoriev
|-
| 1922 match || Vladimir Nenarokov defeated Nikolai Grigoriev
|-
| 1922–23  || Nikolai Grigoriev
|-
| 1923 match || Nikolai Grigoriev drew with Vladimir Nenarokov
|-
| 1923 match || Nikolai Grigoriev drew with Nikolai Zubarev
|-
| 1924    || Nikolai Grigoriev
|-
| 1924 match || Vladimir Nenarokov defeated Nikolai Grigoriev
|-
| 1925    || Aleksandr Sergeyev
|-
| 1926    || Abram Rabinovich
|-
| 1927    || Nikolai Zubarev
|-
| 1928    || Boris Verlinsky
|-
| 1929    || Vasily Panov
|-
| 1929 match || Nikolai Grigoriev
|-
| 1930    || Nikolai Zubarev
|-
| 1931    || Nikolai Riumin
|-
| 1932    || Sergey Belavenets, A. Orlov & Peter Alexeyevich Lebedev
|-
| 1933–34  || Nikolai Riumin
|-
| 1935    || Nikolai Riumin
|-
| 1936    || Vladimir Alatortsev & Ilya Kan
|-
| 1937    || Vladimir Alatortsev & Sergey Belavenets
|-
| 1938    || Sergey Belavenets & Vasily Smyslov
|-
| 1939–40 || Andor Lilienthal
|-
| 1941    || Alexander Kotov
|-
| 1941–42 || Isaak Mazel
|-
| 1942    || Vasily Smyslov
|-
| 1943–44  || Mikhail Botvinnik
|-
| 1944–45  || Vasily Smyslov
|-
| 1946    || David Bronstein
|-
| 1947    || Vladimir Simagin
|-
| 1949    || Yuri Averbakh
|-
| 1950    || Yuri Averbakh & Alexander Nikolayevich Chistyakov
|-
| 1951    || Tigran Petrosian
|-
| 1952    || Vladimir Zagorovsky
|-
| 1953    || David Bronstein
|-
| 1954    || Vladimir Alexandrovich Soloviev
|-
| 1955    || Evgeni Vasiukov
|-
| 1956    || Tigran Petrosian & Vladimir Simagin
|-
| 1957    || David Bronstein
|-
| 1958    || Evgeni Vasiukov
|-
| 1959    || Vladimir Simagin
|-
| 1960    || Evgeni Vasiukov
|-
| 1961    || David Bronstein
|-
| 1962    || Yuri Averbakh & Evgeni Vasiukov
|-
| 1963    || Anatoly Avraamovich Bikhovsky
|-
| 1964    || Nikolai Ivanovich Bakulin
|-
| 1965    || Lev Aronin
|-
| 1966    || Nikolai Ivanovich Bakulin
|-
| 1967    || Anatoly Pavlovich Volovich
|-
| 1968    || David Bronstein & Tigran Petrosian
|-
| 1969    || Igor Zaitsev
|-
| 1970    || Yuri Balashov
|-
| 1971    || Anatoly Lein
|-
| 1972    || Evgeni Vasiukov
|-
| 1973    || Mark Dvoretsky
|-
| 1974    || Boris Gulko
|-
| 1975    || Karen Grigorian
|-
| 1976    || Sergey Makarichev & Mikhail Tseitlin
|-
| 1977    || Mikhail Tseitlin
|-
| 1978    || Evgeni Vasiukov
|-
| 1979    || Karen Grigorian
|-
| 1980    || Anatoly Mikhailovich Kremenetsky
|-
| 1981    || Boris Gulko
|-
| 1982    || David Bronstein & Nukhim Rashkovsky
|-
| 1983    || Evgeny Sveshnikov
|-
| 1984    || Alexey Vyzmanavin
|-
| 1985    || Sergey Gorelov
|-
| 1986    || Alexey Vyzmanavin, Alexey Kuzmin
|-
| 1987    || Ratmir Kholmov
|-
| 1988    || Georgy Timoshenko
|-
| 1989    || Evgeny Bareev
|-
| 1990    || Evgeny Dragomaretzky
|-
| 1991   || Evgeni Maljutin
|-
| 1992   || Alexander Morozevich
|-
| 1993   || Ilya Frog
|-
| 1994    || Alexey Mitenkov
|-
| 1995 || Alexander Rustemov
|-
| 1996 || Yuri Yakovich
|-
| 1997 || Alexander Rustemov
|-
| 1998 || Evgeniy Najer
|-
| 1999 || Evgeny Vorobiov
|-
| 2000 || 
|-
| 2001 || Valentin Arbakov
|-
| 2002 || Andrei Kharitonov
|-
| 2003 ||  Evgeniy Najer
|-
| 2004 ||  Farrukh Amonatov
|-
| 2005 ||  Sergey Grigoriants
|-
| 2006 || Alexander Riazantsev 
|-
| 2007 || Vladimir Belov
|-
| 2008 || Boris Savchenko
|-
| 2009 || Evgeny Vorobiov
|-
| 2010 || Nikolai Chadaev
|-
| 2011 || Nikolai Chadaev
|-
| 2012 || Ivan Popov
|-
| 2013 || Dmitry Gordievsky
|-
| 2014 || Vladimir Belous
|-
| 2015 || Urii Eliseev 
|-
| 2016 || Boris Savchenko
|-
| 2017 || Dmitry Gordievsky
|-
| 2018 || Klementy Sychev
|-
| 2019 || Ivan Popov
|-
| 2020 || Mikhail Antipov
|}

References

 (results through 1985)
Popovsky, Alexey, Championships of Republics, Russian Chess Base
RUSBASE, part V, 1919-1937 and 1991-1995
RUSBASE, part IV, 1938-1960
RUSBASE, part III, 1961-1969 and 1985-1990 
RUSBASE, part II, 1970-1984
2002 edition
2003 edition from chessbase.com
 (2006 results)
 (2007 results)

Chess competitions
Chess in Russia
Chess Championship
Chess in the Soviet Union